James Scott Haig (7 December 1924 – 28 October 1996) was a Scottish-born New Zealand rugby footballer who represented New Zealand in both rugby league and rugby union.

Early years
Haig was born in Scotland but emigrated to New Zealand at a young age with his family and grew up in Kaitangata in Otago. His elder brother, Laurie, was also an All Black. Another brother, Bert, played for Otago in rugby union while another, Bill, represented the province in cricket.

Rugby union career
Haig made his first grade debut for Otago in 1945, playing in four matches, and also playing for the South Island and a New Zealand XV that year.

He played in another five matches in 1946 for Otago and again represented the South Island.

Haig made his All Blacks debut against Australia on 14 September 1946. He played in the next Test match on 28 September, but this was also to be his last, as Haig switched codes to rugby league the following season.

Rugby league career
Haig moved to Canterbury in 1947, playing for the new Prebbleton club in the Canterbury Rugby League competition and representing the province. Pat Smith had lured him north from Dunedin with a cash incentive and a barman's job. He made his debut for the New Zealand national rugby league team that same year. Part of Haig's reason for the switch was the opportunity to tour Great Britain and Haig was selected for the Kiwis 1947–48 tour of his place of birth.

He was the New Zealand captain for nine Test matches between 1951 and 1954. Haig moved clubs in 1952, joining the new Marist club.

Haig returned to Otago in 1954, representing the province and again being selected for the Kiwis. He retired at the end of the year.

Later years
Haig later coached the Pirates club in the Otago Rugby Union competition, where his son Barry played. He was the last New Zealand dual-code rugby international until Kurt Sherlock in 1989.

Haig died aged 71 on 28 October 1996.

The New Zealand Rugby Union presented his family with his All Blacks cap in 2009.

References

1924 births
1996 deaths
Canterbury rugby league team players
Dual-code rugby internationals
Marist-Western Suburbs players
New Zealand international rugby union players
New Zealand national rugby league team captains
New Zealand national rugby league team players
New Zealand rugby league players
New Zealand rugby union coaches
New Zealand rugby union players
Otago rugby league team players
Otago rugby union players
People from Prestonpans
Rugby league halfbacks
Rugby union scrum-halves
British emigrants to New Zealand
South Island rugby league team players
South Island rugby union players